Larry Pinto de Faria (3 November 1932 – 6 May 2016) was a Brazilian football player.

Early life
He was born in Nova Friburgo, Rio de Janeiro. He later lived in Porto Alegre.

Career
He began his career at Fluminense Football Club where he played from 1951 to 1954, and champion of Campeonato Carioca in 1951 and the Copa Rio (International) in 1952, that year he was also the top scorer of the Brazilian team in the 1952 Summer Olympics, when he scored four goals in three games. With Bodinho he formed the most invaluable double striker attack of Internacional.

Larry competed for Brazil at the 1952 Summer Olympics.

Clubs
 Fluminense, 1951–1954
 Internacional, 1954–1961

Honours
 Campeonato Gaúcho: 1955 and 1961
 Panamerican Championship: 1956, with Brazil national football team.

References

1932 births
2016 deaths
People from Nova Friburgo
Brazilian footballers
Association football forwards
Sport Club Internacional players
Sport Club Internacional managers
Fluminense FC players
Brazil international footballers
Footballers at the 1952 Summer Olympics
Olympic footballers of Brazil
Brazilian football managers
Sportspeople from Rio de Janeiro (state)